Koichi Wajima (輪島 功一, born 21 April 1943) is a Japanese former professional boxer who was the undisputed light-middleweight champion. He held the WBA and WBC titles from 1971 and 1974, he regained the titles in January 1975 that included The Ring title but lost it right away on June of the same year. He once again won the WBA and The Ring title in 1976.

Childhood and early career 
Wajima was born in Karafuto, (current Sakhalin) which became Soviet territory when Wajima was three years old. He and his family moved to Shibetsu, Hokkaidō, but barely managed to make a living, Wajima was put up for adoption. He lived with his stepfamily while his parents worked in Shibetsu.

Wajima began to work as a fisherman with his stepfamily. He was still in middle school, but had to work from sunset all the way to daybreak. The only time he had to sleep was during class. He was a fighter from a young age, having to work tirelessly each day, and often picking fights with other kids.

After graduating from middle school, he traveled to Tokyo, where he worked briefly as a truck driver before joining the Misako Boxing Gym. He made his professional debut in March, 1968, at the age of 25.

Professional career 
Wajima captured the Japanese light-middleweight title in September, 1969. He defended the title 9 times before returning it. He got his first shot at the world title against Carmelo Bossi for the world light middleweight title on October 31, 1971, in Tokyo, winning by 15-round split decision to capture his first world title. He made his first defense in May, 1972, taking less than 2 minutes to knock out his opponent. He would defend the title a total of 6 times. He quickly became one of the most popular boxers in Japan for his peculiar "Frog Jump" uppercut punch.

He lost his 7th defense to Oscar Albarado in 1974 by KO in the 15th round. He got a rematch with Albarado 7 months later, on January 21, 1975, and managed to avenge his loss with a 15-round decision win to regain the Lineal, WBC and WBA titles. He was stripped of the WBC title in March, and lost to Jae-Doo Yuh to lose his Lineal and WBA light middleweight titles as well. However, he regained his Lineal and WBA titles in February, 1976, with a 15th-round KO over Yuh.

Wajima lost to Jose Manuel Duran in his first defense, losing the world title for the third time in his career. He fought his final match In June, 1977, challenging Eddie Gazo for the WBA super welterweight title, but lost by 11th-round KO. This was the last fight of his career. His record was 31-6-1 (25KOs).

Professional boxing record

Post retirement 
Like many other Japanese boxers, Wajima became a successful television personality after retiring, and has appeared on game shows and television dramas. He became the head of the Eastern Japan Boxing Council, and has founded his own boxing gym in Tokyo. His brother-in-law also runs a successful dumpling store in Kokubunji, Tokyo. He also claims that condemned prisoner Iwao Hakamada is innocent. Hakamada was later released after 45 years in prison, due to new evidence and discovery of the prosecution's reliance on falsified evidence.

See also 
List of world light-middleweight boxing champions
List of Japanese boxing world champions
Boxing in Japan

References

External links 

 Koichi Wajima boxing gym official (Japanese)
Koichi Wajima - CBZ Profile

1943 births
Living people
Sportspeople from Hokkaido
World Boxing Association champions
World Boxing Council champions
The Ring (magazine) champions
Light-middleweight boxers
World light-middleweight boxing champions
Boxing commentators
Japanese male boxers